Adora, known by her alter-ego She-Ra, is a fictional superheroine in the Masters of the Universe franchise. She is introduced as the protagonist of the 1985 Filmation series She-Ra: Princess of Power and again appears in the 2018 reboot She-Ra and the Princesses of Power. A series of toys under her name was produced by Mattel in 1984.

Her first published appearance was in the 1984 minicomic "The Story of She-ra", which, like the subsequent He-Man and She-Ra animated feature film, introduced her as He-Man's twin sister, Princess Adora, kidnapped by Hordak in her infancy. That minicomic, which features He-Man, the Sorceress of Castle Grayskull, and Castle Grayskull itself, also features one of the very first published appearances of both Hordak and Catra. The minicomic was shipped with the 1985 released original She-Ra action-figure/doll.

In the 1985 series, She-Ra was intended to extend the appeal of the Masters of the Universe setting by being of interest to young girls in the same way that He-Man appealed to young boys. Filmation writers Larry DiTillio and J. Michael Straczynski created the backstory for the property. She-Ra was introduced in the movie The Secret of the Sword as Force Captain Adora of the Horde ruling Etheria, but turned out to be Princess Adora, the long-lost twin sister of He-Man, Prince Adam. The 2018 series features a younger She-Ra and is set in a different universe without connections to Masters of the Universe.

In She-Ra: Princess of Power (1985)

Fictional character biography
King Randor and Queen Marlena from planet Eternia had twins, a boy and a girl named Adam and Adora. Hordak, leader of the Evil Horde, kidnapped Adora and escaped to Etheria, where Adora was raised as a mind-controlled Force Captain of The Horde.  Adora's uniform – which she continued to wear throughout the series, even after defecting to the Rebels – consisted of a red leotard with long white sleeves, red boots with matching gauntlets, and a black belt.

The Sorceress sent Adam and Cringer to the planet Etheria to find the Sword of Protection's rightful owner.  The Sorceress, through the jewel in the Sword of Protection, reveals to Adora that she was kidnapped by The Horde when she was a baby and that she had a twin brother in Adam/He-Man, which she instantly believed. Through her newfound love for her brother and seeing him in trouble, Adora breaks the spell that was making her serve the Horde and transformed into the heroine She-Ra. She then releases a captured He-Man and jumps from a window, crashing into the Horde stables, where she lands atop her personal mount Spirit, who is transformed into Swift Wind, a talking winged unicorn. They fly ahead to warn The Rebellion.  He-Man and She-Ra return to Eternia, but she decides she must return to Etheria so that she can help free the planet from the Horde oppression.

Adora, having been trained by the Horde her entire life, assumes leadership of the Great Rebellion. The epic battle to free Etheria from the grip of the Evil Horde rages on, spreading across the corners of the planet. Through this war, She-Ra calls upon her allies across the globe and the Universe, using their special talents to battle against Horde creations.  It is implied in several episodes that she has romantic feelings towards the rebel pirate Captain Sea Hawk, who is attracted to her in her guise of Adora, as opposed to She-Ra; in the extended MOTU/POP Universe they get Married and have children who aid them in battle on Etheria, Eternia and across the Galaxies, on Primus (Primus is part of Lore in the extended universe, also in New Adventures of He Man) and Earth where Adora and Adam's Mother Marlena is from, and other planets across the universe. Whether or not She-Ra, He-Man and their friends were ever successful in defeating the Horde or the Forces of Evil was never revealed, as both series were cancelled before any definite resolutions could be reached. However, it was shown little-by-little that the citizens and kingdoms all over Etheria were rising up against the Horde and pushing back against their tyranny. Unlike Adam, who often feigned laziness and a carefree attitude to deflect any suspicion that he may be He-Man, Adora never acted against her nature and was always seen as brave and selfless, willing to help others in need at a moment's notice.

When Adora transforms to She-Ra, two castles are shown in the background. The first is Castle Grayskull; the second, Crystal Castle is located atop Skydancer Mountain and is overseen by an entity called Light Hope, who advises She-Ra in times of crisis. In the Princess of Power toyline, the castle is also protected by two winged crystal horses, Moonbeam and Sun Dancer. The Crystal Castle's location is known only to Ahgo (King of the Trolls), She-Ra, her allies who know of her secret (Madame Razz, Kowl and Spirit/Swiftwind) and He-Man and his allies who know of his secret (Sorceress, Man at Arms, Orko and Cringer/BattleCat). She-Ra has sworn to keep its location secret, thus earning the title of "Defender of the Crystal Castle." In the extended MOTU/POP universe, She-Ra travels alongside Sea Hawk in his new version of the Solar Sailor ship, which can now fly in both space and air, ride the sea on water, and submerge in its depths. She also journeys the Universe alongside He Man in his Starship Eternia as a member of the Galaxy Defenders.

Powers and abilities
She-Ra is known for her incredible charismatic behaviors. She has been shown multiple times to be able to lift not only full-grown men and robots, but also mountain-like rocks and buildings. She is depicted as being extremely fast and acrobatic.  Her speed allows her to easily deflect multiple incoming energy blasts with her sword. She-Ra demonstrated a series of other abilities which appear to be more nurturing in nature such as empathic understanding, mental communication with animals, and healing. Whether there is a limit to the length of time she can remain in her heroic form before she reverts to her original form of Adora is unknown. There have been occasions where she is forcibly transformed back into Adora, implying that her powers do have limits to them.

She-Ra's primary weapon is her Sword of Protection. It appears almost indestructible and able to deflect bolts of energy, both magical and technological, as well as project beams of energy from the stone in its center. The stone is also used to turn Spirit into Swift Wind, as the power beam needed to perform the transformation comes from it (as opposed to the Sword of Power, where the energy beam that is used to transform Cringer into Battle Cat is shot from the tip of the sword and requires He-Man to point it directly at Cringer in order for it to work).

In one episode, the stone in She-Ra's sword becomes damaged, causing her to be unable to transform into She-Ra. Another potential weakness is that the sword requires vocal command: in an episode in which Shadow Weaver captured Adora's voice, Adora was then unable to transform into She-Ra as she was unable to speak her words of transformation to the sword ("For the honor of Grayskull, I am She-Ra").

The sword also had transmutation abilities – upon command it would change shape into whatever She-Ra required at the time, for example a shield, parachute, helmet, rope with grappling hook, and a boomerang. She-Ra is largely non-violent and engages in combat only as a last resort.

Reception
She-Ra is mostly considered a positive role model for women, although some have criticized her for being a poor female counterpart to He-Man.

In She-Ra and the Princesses of Power (2018–2020)

On December 12, 2017, DreamWorks Animation and Netflix announced a reboot series based on She-Ra. The series was executively produced by author ND Stevenson (creator of Nimona and Lumberjanes). The cast was revealed on May 18, 2018, alongside a poster and the official series title: She-Ra and the Princesses of Power. It premiered on November 13, 2018, on Netflix. Unlike the original series, He-Man has no presence in the reboot storyline and is not portrayed  to be related or connected in any way, last appearing in a 2002 series. The reboot is a reimagining of the 1980s version and is not part of the Masters of the Universe storyline.

Fictional character biography
In this series, Adora is a young teenage girl in season 1, portrayed as a willing member of the Horde who was raised to believe that the princesses are evil and oppress Etheria. She was brought up in the rigorous military environment alongside Catra under their mentor/mother-figure Shadow Weaver, who took Adora in after Hordak found her as a baby years prior. When Adora is promoted to Force Captain, her world view greatly changed when she finds the Sword of Protection one day after sneaking out of the Horde base. She is soon captured by two rebels, Princess Glimmer and her best friend Bow, learning the truth that the Horde are the real oppressors. Upon the revelation and gaining the ability to become She-Ra, Adora joins the rebellion, winning over its hesitant members while struggling in mastering her powers. But Adora's defection causes a rift between her and Catra, whose initial feelings of abandonment become resentment towards her closest friend, with Adora eventually seeing Catra as an enemy when she nearly destroyed Etheria out of spite. Catra regains her friendship with Adora and helps in defeating the Horde.

Adora later learns that she is a descendant of the First Ones, a colonizer race that weaponized Etheria to harvest its magic in their Heart of Etheria project, revealed to have been brought to Etheria by Light Hope to fulfill her mission. This forces Adora to destroy the Sword of Protection to prevent Etheria's destruction, but leaves it open to invasion by Horde Prime. But while leaving Etheria to save Glimmer and Catra, Adora regains her ability to become She-Ra. Adora later learns that only she can restore the magic to Etheria with the risk of dying in the process, but is saved by Catra as the two finally express their romantic feelings for each other.

Powers, abilities and appearance
Compared to the original version of the character, Adora has a much younger appearance, only becoming considerably taller as She-Ra: . In addition, She-Ra's costume is much more practical in this incarnation; she wears a full tunic that covers her upper torso with metallic epaulets while wearing bike-short type leggings under her skirt. She now wears practical armored boots with flat soles. In the season 1 finale, She-Ra wears a golden battle armor very similar to when her 2002 twin brother He-Man wears a snake armor in his Season 2.

In the second season, She-Ra uses a new power discovered in her sword, which can transform it into any kind of weapon or piece of equipment. But her control over the transformations is not perfect. After destroying the Sword of Protection in the season 4 finale, Adora couldn't transform until halfway through season 5, after which she gained a new unnamed appearance for She-Ra (dubbed by fans as She-Ra 2.0): she wore her long golden hair in a regular ponytail that reached down to her back, wore a different diadem/headpiece with smaller wings, white pants with golden bracelets for her thighs and longer golden arm bands while the sword became a mystic projection that turns into a slimmed-down battle blade.

Reception
While reviewing the first season of Princesses of Power, Alex Abad-Santos of Vox praised how the series fleshed out her character, calling the rebooted rendition of Adora "more human than the original". Conversely, IGN's David Griffin was more critical of Adora, writing that her "sudden lifestyle change feels rushed, like we needed a few more episodes of her mentally wrestling with the implications of it all." Griffin also criticized her "seemingly unparalleled strength," stating it "often makes her seem more like One Punch Woman and robs the show of much of its suspense once Adora transforms."

Adora's explicit lesbian relationship with Catra was positively received by critics, with many considering their dynamic "captivating" and "groundbreaking".

In other media

"The Story of She-ra"
While Adora/She-Ra's first on screen appearance was the 1985 animated theatrical movie "He-Man and She-Ra: The Secret of The Sword", her actual very first appearance was in the 1984 created and published "The Story of She-Ra" Mattel minicomic, which was packaged with the original She-Ra toy. The main premise of the story, the first ever published story of She-Ra's origin, is roughly identical to the version shown in the Secret of The Sword Movie, opening in almost the exact same manner, with the Sorceress of Grayskull having a nightmarish recollection of baby Princess Adora being abducted from the royal palace of Eternia by the evil warlock/warlord Hordak, and whisked away to Etheria. As in the movie & subsequent She-Ra television series, Adora's twin brother Adam/He-Man is sent to find her. Differences between the comic and the film include Catra being a more powerful and prominent villain in the comic (she becomes the primary antagonist, and is also portrayed as a powerful sorceress, able to transform people into werecats), and slight differences in the looks of Catra, She-Ra and the Crystal Palace.

He-Man and She-Ra:The Secret of the Sword (1985 animated film) 

In 1985, Filmation, the studio which produced the He-Man cartoon series, released a full-length 91 minute feature film titled The Secret of the Sword also known as He-Man and She-Ra: The Secret of the Sword. The movie transitioned from a focus on He-Man, to an introduction of Adam's/He-Man's twin sister Adora, whom the film reveals to have been abducted, as an infant, by Hordak and Skeletor. Hordak raised Adora to be a warrior and captain for his Evil Horde, and hid her true heritage from her. The film reveals that He-Man's power sword also has a twin, the Sword of Protection, which, when wielded by Adora to summon the power of Grayskull, transforms her into She-Ra, the female counterpart to He-Man. The movie grossed over three times its two-million dollar production budget. It was later divided into several shorter segments, and aired on television as the first several episodes of the He-Man & MOTU spinoff series She-Ra: Princess of Power.

He-Man & She-Ra: A Christmas Special (1985 made for television Christmas movie) 

At the height of the conjoined popularity of the "He-Man and The Masters of The Universe" and She-Ra: Princess of Power cartoons, Filmation produced this made for television Christmas movie, and aired it in syndication during the 1985 Christmas Holiday season. The original He-Man and The Masters of The Universe cartoon series had aired its final new episode the prior month, and continued to air in re-run episodes for some time after. Its sister show, She-Ra: Princess of Power was still in its first season. The Christmas special reunited twins He-Man and She-Ra in their biggest joint adventure since the Secret of The Sword. It commences with Queen Marlena reflecting nostalgically about Christmases on Earth, and, after a series of misadventures set in motion by Orko, climaxes with a confrontation that pits He-Man, She-Ra and Skeletor (whose bone-hard heart has been briefly softened by a pair of Earthling children, a peculiar pup, and Christmas Spirit) against Hordak and Horde-Prime.

Masters of the Universe film (1987)
She-Ra was originally intended to appear in Masters of the Universe and concept art by production designer William Stout was even commissioned, but director Gary Goddard felt it would be best to concentrate on He-Man for the first film. (It would be the only film.)  She-Ra was planned to appear in the sequel; the sequel film was cancelled and rewritten into Cyborg, with She-Ra's equivalent character, Nady Simmons, portrayed by Deborah Richter.

Masters of the Universe Classics (2008–2015)
She-Ra appears in the Mattel Masters of the Universe toyline launched in 2008, which attempts to create a new canon by merging selected portions of existing media together with new story elements. The story is told via a combination of mini-comics packaged with the action figures and the biographies printed on the toy packaging.

In this version of events, Hordak arrived on Etheria after being trapped in the dimension of Despondos by King Grayskull. His apprentice Skeletor kidnaps Adora and sends her to Etheria. After being raised by the Horde and becoming She-Ra (as in the cartoon series), she eventually returns to Eternia with several of her friends and allies, to help He-Man defeat Hordak, who has overthrown King Randor and conquered the planet. She-Ra follows her brother into space on their New Adventures to the planet Primus, and together they battle the Horde Empire's ruler Horde Prime. At some point in the future, she would end up returning in the new, villainous persona of Despara.

DC Comics (2012–present)
In December 2012, She-Ra appeared in her own DC Comics series as a lead-in to her introduction into the He-Man and the Masters of the Universe comic series.  Adora's introduction is an updated retelling of her classic origin story. Although she was still kidnapped as a baby and raised by the Horde, Adora's personality and life are made much more violent and tragic when compared to her animated counterpart.

Rather than being a kind woman who has been under the mind control of Shadow Weaver, Despara (Adora's Horde name) is a brutal force captain who is fully aware of the Horde's cruel and evil nature and, although she has some reservations, serves them willingly. Rather than having already taken over the planet of Etheria, instead, Despara leads the Horde in taking over Eternia and driving He-Man, King Randor and the Masters into hiding so as to rebel against the Horde. Due to a connection between herself and Teela, Adora begins to break free of the Horde's will, and begins her journey into becoming She-Ra.

He-Man: The Most Powerful Game in the Universe (2012)
She-Ra appeared in the  2012 handheld video game He-Man: The Most Powerful Game in the Universe.

She-Ra live action television series 
On September 13, 2021, Amazon announced that a live action She-Ra series is in development with DreamWorks Animation serving as an executive producer as the series will be a new, standalone story and will not be connected to the 2018 animated show.

References

Further reading
Andrade, Jessica. (2003)  “The Gender Politics of Female Action Heroes in Television and Films.” Bachelor's thesis, University of Washington

External links

She-Ra: Princess of Power at YouTube
She-Ra: Princess of Power at Hulu

1980s toys
Action figures
Adoptee characters in television
Animated human characters
Comics characters introduced in 1984
Extraterrestrial superheroes
Female characters in animated series
Female superheroes
Fictional characters who can move at superhuman speeds
Fictional characters who use magic
Fictional characters with energy-manipulation abilities
Fictional characters with healing abilities
Fictional characters with slowed ageing
Fictional characters with superhuman durability or invulnerability
Fictional characters with superhuman senses
Fictional characters with superhuman strength
Fictional defectors
Fictional empaths
Adora
Fictional lesbians
Fictional LGBT characters in television
Fictional shapeshifters
Fictional female swordfighters
Fictional swordfighters in television
Fictional telepaths
Fictional twins
Fictional women soldiers and warriors
LGBT characters in animated television series
LGBT characters in animation
LGBT superheroes
Magical girl characters
Mattel
Princess of Power characters
Superheroes who are adopted
Television characters introduced in 1985